Pirojsha Adi Godrej is an Indian industrialist and businessman. He is the Executive Chairman of Godrej Properties Limited, the real estate development arm of the Godrej Group, of which his father, Adi Godrej, is the chairman.

Early life and education

Pirojsha Godrej graduated from the Wharton School of Business in 2002, and completed his Masters in International Affairs from Columbia University in 2004. He completed his schooling from The Cathedral & John Connon School.

Career 
Pirojsha Godrej worked with Godrej Properties Limited from 2004 to 2006 during which time he was responsible for directing the company’s expansion strategy, which saw the company increase its operations from 2 cities to 10 cities between 2004 and 2008.  He went on to complete an MBA from Columbia Business School in 2008 before rejoining GPL as executive director.

In 2010, Pirojsha led the initial public offering (IPO) of the company through which Godrej Properties raised US$100 million. In 2012, Pirojsha was appointed CEO of Godrej Properties. He has led the company through a phase of rapid growth through which the company has established itself as one of India's fastest growing real estate developers.

Under Pirojsha’s leadership, Godrej Properties has been focusing on sustainable development movement; in 2013, GPL received an award from former President of India, APJ Abdul Kalam for being one of the companies in India from across sectors to have driven the green building movement. The Clinton Foundation has partnered with Godrej Properties for its large township project, Godrej Garden City, which was selected as one of two projects in India and seventeen from around the world to work with the Clinton Climate Initiative towards the goal of creating a Climate Positive Development.

In 2013, Pirojsha was selected as the 'Real Estate Person of the Year' at the Construction Week India Awards and the ‘Person of the Year’ at the GIREM (Global Initiative for Restructuring Environment and Management) Awards. In 2014, he received the Best People CEO Award from the National Human Resource Development Network. In 2015, The Economic Times selected him in their 40 under 40 list, a list of the most impactful business leaders under 40 years of age. He was also listed by GQ magazine as one of the 50 most influential young Indians.

Prior to joining Godrej Properties, Pirojsha served as the additional private secretary to the Minister of State for External Affairs in New Delhi and worked as an intern in the New York Senate Office of Hillary Clinton.

Family and personal life 

Pirojsha's interests include cricket, food, politics, chess and rare-book collecting.  He is married and has a daughter.

References 

Living people
Businesspeople from Mumbai
Indian business executives
Wharton School of the University of Pennsylvania alumni
School of International and Public Affairs, Columbia University alumni
Godrej Group
Year of birth missing (living people)
Godrej family